Mohd Jafni bin Md Shukor (born  28 January 1972) is a Malaysian politician. A member of the United Malays National Organisation (UMNO) which leads the Barisan Nasional (BN), he is the UMNO Deputy Division Chief of Kulai. He contested for Bukit Permai at the 2022 Johor state election and successfully defeated the then incumbent Tosrin Jarvanthi, who contested under the Perikatan Nasional (PN) banner. Shortly after his election, he sworn as one of the Johor State Executive Councilor.

Election results

References 

Living people
People from Johor
Malaysian people of Malay descent
Malaysian Muslims
United Malays National Organisation politicians
21st-century Malaysian politicians
Members of the Johor State Legislative Assembly
1972 births